Quimperlé is a commune in the Finistère department of Brittany in northwestern France.

Geography
Quimperlé is in the southeast of Finistère, 20 km to the west of Lorient and 44 km to the east of Quimper. Historically, it belongs to Cornouaille. The town is situated at the confluence of the Isole and Ellé rivers that combine to form the Laïta river, hence its name: confluent (kemper-) of the Ellé (-le). A fourth smaller river, the Dourdu (black water in Breton), joins the Laïta downstream. Quimperlé station has rail connections to Quimper, Lorient, Vannes and Rennes.

The city is traditionally divided in two parts, the High Town and the Lower Town. The Lower Town, in the valley, is the historical centre, and developed around the Saint-Colomban church (of which only the front wall remains) and the abbey of Sainte Croix (Holy Cross). It covers the land between the Ellé and Isole rivers as well as the banks of the Laïta, an area that is sometimes flooded.

The more modern High Town, in the plain above the valley, centres around the Saint-Michel church and its market square. Seen from the Lower Town, its "mountain" topped with the Saint-Michel church has earned Quimperlé the nickname of "Mount Saint Michel on land"

The town also developed, less importantly, on the East side of the valley, facing the Saint Michel mountain. This area is called Bourgneuf, a common name for recent neighbourhoods.

Map

Population
Inhabitants of Quimperlé are called in French Quimperlois.

History
It seems that the area was first inhabited by Neanderthals, since remains of Mousterian-style stone tools have been found in the forest between Quimperlé and Clohars-Carnoët. A few dolmens were erected in Quimperlé itself, although there is no trace of an actual settlement in the prehistoric times.

A first settlement was built in the Middle Ages, called Villa Anaurot, after a 5th-century British prince, but it is thought to have been destroyed by the Normans in 868.

A new town called Quimperlé grew around the abbey of Sainte Croix, which was founded in the 12th century. The Romanesque basilica from the abbey can still be seen. The church of St Michel was built in the 14th and 15th centuries and its impressive tower dominates the town from its hilltop position.

Breton language
The municipality launched a linguistic plan concerning the Breton language through Ya d'ar brezhoneg on December 18, 2008.
In 2008, 3.17% of primary-school children attended bilingual schools.

Gallery

Old houses

See also
Communes of the Finistère department
Entry on sculptor Jean Joncourt who lived in Quimperlé
List of works of the two Folgoët ateliers
Henri Alphonse Barnoin

References

External links

 Town council website 
 Tourist office website 
  Cultural Heritage 

Communes of Finistère